Verkündigung ("Annunciation") is a 1935 mystery opera (ein Mysterium) in a prologue and four acts by Walter Braunfels to the composer's own libretto after the German translation of Paul Claudel's L'Annonce faite a Marie. Claudel's play tells the story of a woman, Violaine, who moved by pity kisses a leper and contracts leprosy herself, but heals the leper she had embraced. Violaine also brings back to life the child born to her sister Mara and Jacques, the man who betrayed her, and then dies herself. The names of Claudel's characters are germanified so the father Andre Vercors becomes Andreas Gradherz, Pierre de Craon becomes Peter von Ulm, and so on. The opera was premiered on 4 April 1948 in Cologne, conducted by Hellmut Schnackenburg, with Trude Eipperle as Violaine.

Roles

Recordings
Verkündigung – Andrea Trauboth (Violaine), Chieko Shirasaka-Teratani (Mara), Siegmund Nimsgern (Andreas Gradherz), Claudia Rüggeberg (the mother), John Bröcheler (Jacobaeus), Christer Bladin (Peter von Ulm). Köln SO & Chor, Dennis Russell Davies 1992
Verkündigung – Juliane Banse (Violaine), Janina Baechle (Mara), Robert Holl (the father), Hanna Schwarz (the mother), Adrian Eröd (Jacques), Chor des Bayerischen Rundfunks, Münchner Rundfunkorchester, Ulf Schirmer 2014

References

Operas
1935 operas
Operas by Walter Braunfels
Operas based on plays